Last Day on Earth may refer to:

Music
Last Day on Earth (album), a 1994 album by John Cale & Bob Neuwirth
"Last Day on Earth", a song by Duran Duran from the album Pop Trash
"The Last Day on Earth", a 2008 song by Kate Miller-Heidke
"The Last Day on Earth", a song by Marilyn Manson from the album Mechanical Animals

Films
 4:44 Last Day on Earth, a 2011 drama
 Last Day on Earth (film), a 2012 film starring Bellamy Young

Television
 Last Days on Earth, a 20/20 special which aired in 2006
 "Last Day on Earth" (The Walking Dead), an episode of The Walking Dead television series

See also
 Last days (disambiguation)
 Last Night on Earth (disambiguation)